Lucky Hit is one of the oldest brick houses in southwestern Clarke County, Virginia.  The double-pile (i.e. two rooms deep), central hallway house was built by Colonel Richard Kidder Meade around 1791, and was named by Meade in his belief that he had made a fortunate choice in his property. He previously resided at the log house Meadea. His children, including Bishop William Meade and Ann Randolph Meade Page, who were raised on this plantation established plantations nearby; many of the historic houses remain today. This property stayed in the Meade family until 1869.

It was listed on the National Register of Historic Places in 1993.

References

External links
 

Plantation houses in Virginia
Houses on the National Register of Historic Places in Virginia
Federal architecture in Virginia
Houses completed in 1791
Houses in Clarke County, Virginia
National Register of Historic Places in Clarke County, Virginia
Meade family of Virginia